Murphy Peak is a prominent, partly ice-covered peak, 1,280 m, standing at the south side of Salmon Glacier, 2.7 nautical miles (5.0 km) southwest of Haggerty Hill, on the Scott Coast, Victoria Land. Named by Advisory Committee on Antarctic Names (US-ACAN) in 1992 after Robert L. Murphy of Holmes and Narver, Inc., manager of the support contractor to the U.S. Antarctic Program, 1976–80 and 1990–92; responsible for integrating operations of the (resulting in shared logistics and engineering capabilities) and for preparation of the McMurdo Station Long-Range Development Plan used to modernize infrastructure, 1980–92.

Mountains of Victoria Land
Scott Coast